{{Infobox film
| name           = Ribbit
| image          = RIBBIT (font).png
| alt            =
| caption        =
| director       = Chuck Powers
| producer       = Shireen M. Hashim
| screenplay     = Chuck PowersAmir Hafizi
| story          = Chuck Powers
| starring       = Sean AstinTim CurryRussell PetersCherami Leigh
| music          = Edry Abdul Halim
| cinematography =
| editing        = Ezaisyirwan Basri
| studio         = KRU StudiosCrest Animation StudiosWestern Pictures| distributor    = KRU Film
| released       = 
| runtime        = 88 minutes
| country        = Malaysia
| language       = EnglishMalay
| budget         =
| gross          =
}}Ribbit'' is a 2014 Malaysian 3D computer-animated comedy film produced by KRU Studios and Crest Animation Studios Western Pictures. It is directed by Chuck Powers from a screenplay by Powers and Hamir Afizi and features the voices of Sean Astin, Russell Peters, Tim Curry, and Cherami Leigh.

Synopsis
All his life, Ribbit has felt different from all the other frogs. To find purpose in his life, Ribbit embarks on an incredible journey through the  Amazon Rainforest. During this journey, Ribbit is accidentally hypnotised into believing he is a human prince trapped in a frog's body. Convinced that he now understands why he is different, Ribbit heads out in his search for the Princess whose kiss will solve all his problems. Joined by his best friend, a female squirrel named Sandy, Ribbit encounters an amazingly zany cast of unique and colourful characters.

Cast
 Sean Astin as Ribbit, a poison dart frog with an identity crisis, the main protagonist
 Russell Peters as Deepak, a bat with the answers to life's questions
 Tim Curry as Terrence, a toucan with a flair for colours
 Cherami Leigh as Sandy, a female flying squirrel who is Ribbit's best friend
 Elza Irdalynna as Rafa and Luciano, two leopard cubs
 Amelia Henderson as Marcella, Rafa and Luciano's sister
 Abigail Cole as Bianca, a baby howler monkey
 Lydia Lubon as Carla, Bianca's mother
 Carey Van Driest as Avelina, Carla's sister
 Chuck Powers as Grandpa, Carla and Avelina's father
 Sonny Franks as Kai, a caiman who lives in a waterfall and the main antagonist
 Christina Orow as Jojo, a manatee
 Sonny Franks as Ollie, Jojo's partner
 Kennie Dowle as the spider
 Valentine Cawley as the Witch Doctor
 Martin Dysart as Inego.
 Dilly Shakir as Callie, Inego's wife
 Ali Astin as the Princess, future leader of an Amazonian tribe

Production
The film is co-produced by KRU Studios and Crest Animation Studios with partial financing from the Malaysian government's Multimedia Development Corporation. The development and post-production work was entirely completed in Cyberjaya, Malaysia, while the animation took place in Cyberjaya, Malaysia and Mumbai, India, and most of the rendering was done in Hong Kong. The lead voices were recorded in Los Angeles with additional voices recorded in Dallas, Texas and Kuala Lumpur, Malaysia.

Music
The film's main musical theme is Magical Moment, a duet by American R&B group Az Yet and Jaclyn Victor, winner of Malaysian Idol. The other song on the original sound track is Destiny, produced by DJ Motiv8 and performed by SuPreme featuring Felice LaZae.

Release
The film was presented at the Cannes Film Market in 2012 at the project stage. It premiered at the Niagara Integrated Film Festival on 21 June 2014 where it won Best Family Film. It was released theatrically in Malaysia on 4 September 2014. It was released in the United States on DVD on 25 November 2014.

References

External links
 
 

2014 films
Malaysian animated films
Malaysian 3D films
Animated films about frogs
Animated films about squirrels
Animated films about birds
Films about bats
Films about spiders
Films set in the Amazon
English-language Malaysian films
KRU Studios films